Walter Raymond "Ret" Turner (April 14, 1929 – May 4, 2016) was an American costume designer, best known for his dressing of entertainment icons such as Cher, Lucille Ball, Barry Manilow, Neil Diamond, Shirley Booth, Lily Tomlin, Marie Osmond, Dolly Parton, Diana Ross, Billy Crystal, and Jean Stapleton. He had 23 Emmy nominations and five wins.

Turner began his career on the Dinah Shore Chevrolet Show, and except for his reoccurring role as one of the Flying Silvermans on The Andy Williams Show, has been designing ever since. Alongside Bob Mackie and Ray Aghayan, Turner opened a design and costume rental company, Ret Turner Costume Rentals, that featured their designs and costumes.

References

External links

1929 births
2016 deaths
American costume designers
Emmy Award winners
People from Jackson County, Florida